Wild Rose Brewery, established in 1996 as an independent craft brewery in Calgary, Alberta, Canada, is now a part of Sapporo Breweries of Japan.

History
Wild Rose Brewery was founded in 1996 by Mike Tymchuk and Alan Yule. The brewery was initially located in Foothills Industrial Park, and only produced draught beer for sale in bars. In 2002 the brewery began bottling beer in 1 L flip-top bottles.

In 2006 the brewery moved to Building AF23 at Currie Barracks. The building, a Quonset hut originally built as a clothing supply store, was renovated to include not only the brewery but also the Taproom—an on-site pub. Upon having moved to the new location the brewery also expanded their business into bottling their products in 341 mL bottles.

The brewery's increased popularity and doubts whether their lease at Currie Barracks would be renewed prompted the company to relocate the bulk of their production to a new location in Foothills Industrial Park (less than 1 km from Big Rock Brewery) in 2013. Their most popular beers are produced at the new facility, while certain seasonal and limited edition beers are still produced in small batches at the Currie Barracks facility, and rotating "Tap Room Cask" and "Brewers Tap" beers are available on tap only at the Taproom.

In the spring of 2015 Wild Rose began packaging their beers in cans for the first time.

In 2019, shareholders of Wild Rose Brewery voted to accept a takeover offer from Sleeman Breweries, which is itself owned by Sapporo Breweries of Japan. Due to its loss of independent ownership, Wild Rose was immediately removed from the Alberta Small Brewers Association.

Beer

Wild Rose brews a set of 'core' beers, which are widely distributed on-tap in bars and available in liquor stores throughout Alberta:

IPA - an India Pale Ale; formerly known as Industrial Pale Ale
Velvet Fog - an unfiltered pale wheat ale
WRaspberry Ale - a wheat ale infused with real raspberries
Electric Avenue - a pale lager
Barracks Brown - a brown ale
Cowbell - a sour ale made using the kettle souring technique

Other Wild Rose beers are only available on-tap:

Alberta Crude - an oatmeal stout
WRed Wheat - a North American-style dark wheat ale
S.O.B. - "Special Old Bitter", a pale bitter

A wide variety of seasonal and limited edition beers are also produced. Some of these include:
 Ponderosa Gose - Only available in summer; A tropical wheat beer with passion fruit, salt and coriander
 Cherry Porter - Only available in winter; An American-style porter brewed with BC cherries

Accolades
Wild Rose's Cherry Porter has been recognized as a top beer by several books including 1001 Beers You Must Taste Before You Die and World's Best Beers: One Thousand Craft Brews from Cask to Glass.

It was also the only Alberta brewery to be recognized at the 2008 Canadian Brewing Awards, winner of two silver medals for its wheat beer (Velvet Fog) and its barley wine. The brewery also received two bronze medals at the 2015 Canadian Brewing Awards for Electric Avenue lager and Natural Born Keller kellerbier.

The Taproom was voted Best Brew Pub, Best Local Brew many times since 2007 by the now-defunct FFWD Weekly..

See also

 Beer in Canada

References

External links

Beer brewing companies based in Alberta
Companies based in Calgary